The Rolls-Royce Marine Spey is a marine gas turbine based on the Rolls-Royce Spey and TF41 aircraft turbofan engines. The Marine Spey currently powers seven ship classes including the Royal Navy's Type 23 frigates and provides a power output of 19.5 MW (about 26,150HP). The Marine Spey incorporates technology from the Tay and RB211.

Applications
 
 
 
 
 
 
 
 
 Type 23 frigate 
 Type 22 frigate

Specifications

See also

References

External links

 Rolls-Royce.com Spey Marine gas turbine page

Aero-derivative engines
Gas turbines
Marine engines